is a Japanese comedy manga series written and illustrated by Yūgo Ishikawa which was adapted into a 26-episode anime series, produced by NAS and broadcast by Animax in 2004.

Story 
A young man named , upon passing by a pet shop on his way home, happens upon a water Kappa in the window, which he buys, names , and is determined to raise as a pet. Never having owned a kappa before, he relies on a book that specializes in information on how to raise and train kappa. However, Kaatan is harder to train than it immediately seems, and a lot of patience is exerted by Watashi in his effort.

Characters

References

External links
 Official website 
 

2003 manga
2004 Japanese television series debuts
2005 Japanese television series endings
Animax original programming
Anime series
Comedy anime and manga
Fantasy anime and manga
Seinen manga
Shueisha franchises
Shueisha manga
Works about kappa (folklore)